Hey Ya may refer to:

 "Hey Ya!", a song by Outkast
 Hey Ya, a 2005 album by Sarosh Sami
 "Hey Ya", a song by Jun Jin from the 2009 album Fascination